The Hunter 140 is an American dinghy that was designed by the Hunter Design Team as a sailing trainer and first built in 2003.

Production
The design was built by Hunter Marine in the United States starting in 2003, but it is now out of production.

Design
The Hunter 140 is an unsinkable sailing dinghy, built of ACP, thermoformed and UV protected plastic, with a fiberglass mat and injected foam construction. It has a fractional sloop rig, an aluminum mast and boom with stainless steel standing rigging, a raked stem, a vertical transom, a transom-hung rudder controlled by a tiller and a retractable centerboard. It displaces  and can accommodate three occupants.

Factory options included a roller furling jib, a launching dolly, a road trailer, a motor mount and a  outboard motor for docking and maneuvering.

See also
List of sailing boat types

Related design
Hunter 146

Similar sailboats
Laser 2

References

Dinghies
2000s sailboat type designs
Sailboat types built by Hunter Marine
Sailboat type designs by Hunter Design Team